Matsoukas is a Greek surname. Notable people with the surname include:

Lefteris Matsoukas (born 1990), Greek footballer
Melina Matsoukas (born 1981), American music video director

Greek-language surnames